Spartanburg County School District 3 (SCSD3) is a public school district in Spartanburg County, South Carolina, US. Led by superintendent Kenny Blackwood, the district operates seven schools and the Daniel Morgan Technology Center.

List of schools

Elementary schools
 Cannons Elementary School
 Cowpens Elementary School

Middle and junior high schools
 Cowpens Middle School 
 Middle School of Pacolet

High schools
 Gettys D. Broome High School

References

External links
Spartanburg School District 3 homepage

School districts in South Carolina
Education in Spartanburg County, South Carolina